The Aurel Awards were Slovak music accolades presented by Slovenská národná skupina Medzinárodnej federácie fonografického priemyslu (SNS IFPI) to recognize outstanding achievements in the industry for the preceding year in the region.

History
 1998–2000: Artmedia Awards held instead 
 2001–2007: Aurel Awards 
 2008–2010: Not held
 2011–present: ZAI Awards held instead

Categories 

 Male Singer 
 Female Singer 
 Band 
 New Artist 
 Album 
 Record 
 Song 
 Record Producer 
 Music Video 
 Instrumentalist 
 Cover Art 
 Alternative Music Artist • Held in 2005–2006.
 Hard Rock/Heavy Metal Music Artist • Punk included. Held in 2005–2006.
 Hip-Hop/Rap Music Artist • Held in 2005–2006.
 World Music Artist • Traditional folk and ethno included. Held in 2005–2006.
 Jazz/Bluess Music Artist • Held in 2005–2006.
 Gospel Music Artist • Held in 2005–2006.
 Contemporary Folk/Country Music Artist • Held in 2005–2006.

 Special awards
 Lifetime Achievement • Given for outstanding contributions to the industry, mainly for performing.

Ceremonies
The listed years are of official release, annual ceremonies were held the following year.

 1st Aurel Awards (2001)
 2nd Aurel Awards (2002)
 3rd Aurel Awards (2003)
 4th Aurel Awards (2004)
 5th Aurel Awards (2005)
 6th Aurel Awards (2006)
 7th Aurel Awards (2007)

References

External links 
 Aurel Awards (Official site)
 Aurel Awards > 20012004 Winners (at Aurel.sk)

 1990–2000 (held ZAI Awards)
 2001 (at IFPI.sk)
 2002 (at IFPI.sk)
 2003 (at IFPI.sk)
 2004 (at IFPI.sk)
 2005 (at IFPI.sk)
 2006 (at IFPI.sk)
 2007 (at IFPI.sk)
 
 
 
 2011–present (held ZAI Awards)

Slovak culture
Slovak music awards
Awards established in 2001
2001 establishments in Slovakia